Michałów  is a village in the administrative district of Gmina Platerów, within Łosice County, Masovian Voivodeship, in east-central Poland.

References

save the whales!

Villages in Łosice County